The March 1933 Nashville tornado outbreak was a deadly tornado outbreak that affected the city of Nashville and the Middle Tennessee region on March 14, 1933. The entire outbreak produced five or more tornadoes, killed 44 people, and injured at least 461. One of the tornadoes was an F3 tornado family that struck downtown Nashville, killing 15 people and injuring 235. It is the seventh-deadliest tornado in Middle Tennessee on record and is one of two significant tornado events in the region in 1933, the other being the Beaty Swamp tornado of May 10, 1933.

Meteorological synopsis
In mid-March 1933, most of the Tennessee and Mississippi Valleys experienced a very warm late winter season due to a warm southerly flow coming in from the Gulf of Mexico, which bumped temperatures into the upper 70s and low 80s °F on March 14—well above normal temperatures in the upper 40s and low 50s °F. Two extratropical low pressure systems were moving across the central part of the continent with one storm centered over the Great Lakes and another one over Arkansas. With the southern storm, a cold front swiftly neared from the west and produced a squall line of thunderstorms along it.

Confirmed tornadoes

March 14

Nashville–Lebanon, Tennessee

At around 6:45 p.m. local time—approximately one hour after sunset—one thunderstorm neared what is now the Nashville metropolitan area. The tornado intensified as it proceeded into downtown Nashville, shattering windows in the Tennessee State Capitol. The tornado extensively damaged many structures in downtown Nashville and passed only several hundred feet from the U.S. Weather Bureau office. Within a  segment of the path through East Nashville, the tornado was particularly damaging to homes, churches, businesses, and schools. In this area alone, the tornado damaged or destroyed at least 1,400 homes and more than 60 other buildings. All of the 11 deaths in Nashville occurred on the east side of the city. The Donelson neighborhood sustained severe damage as homes were reduced to "splinters", other buildings were leveled, and trees and power lines were felled. The tornado was last reported in the Hermitage part of Nashville, home to The Hermitage plantation, former residence of U.S. President Andrew Jackson. After traveling , the tornado likely lifted and reformed into a second tornado. Practically no damage occurred in extreme eastern Davidson County.

Shortly afterward, the tornado dipped to the ground and re-intensified. In Lebanon, about 228 structures were damaged or destroyed; 20 of them were called "ruined." Two deaths occurred along the outskirts of Lebanon, and two more occurred in the Bellwood suburb of Nashville. In all, the tornado killed 15 people and injured at least 45. The tornado disproved residents' illusion that hills to the southwest protected Nashville from tornadoes. Based on descriptions and photographs of the damage, the tornado is estimated to have been an F3; the Fujita scale had not been implemented at that time, and would not be devised until 1971. Damage was estimated at $2.2 million ($27.5 million in 1998 dollars). After the storm, National Guard troops, the Red Cross, Salvation Army officials, and the Boy Scouts quickly responded in the cleanup and recovery efforts. Due to the fast and heavy response of local police, looting and panic was minimal.

On April 16, 1998, another F3 tornado, which started near the same point as the 1933 tornado, affected the downtown area. Then, nearly 22 years later, just after midnight on March 3, 2020, an EF3 tornado moved through Downtown Nashville nearly affecting the same areas as the earlier two storms.

See also
 List of North American tornadoes and tornado outbreaks
 1998 Nashville tornado outbreak
 Tornado outbreak of March 2–3, 2020

References

Bibliography

External links
 Event synopsis from Mark A. Rose, National Weather Service

F4 tornadoes by date
Tornadoes in Tennessee
Tornadoes in Kentucky
Nashville,1933-03-14
1933 natural disasters in the United States
Tornadoes of 1933
1933 in Tennessee
1933 in Kentucky
March 1933 events in the United States